The 1996–97 Coppa Italia, the 50th Coppa Italia was an Italian Football Federation domestic cup competition won by Vicenza.

Preliminary round

p=after penalty shoot-out

Final phase

Knockout stage

Final

First leg

Second leg

Vicenza won 3–1 on aggregate.

Top goalscorers

References
rsssf.com

Coppa Italia seasons
Coppa Italia, 1996-97
Coppa Italia